NYSARC may refer to:

 New York State Appalachian Regional Commission, a regional economic development agency
 New York State Association of Regional Councils, ten regional councils throughout New York State
 New York State Avian Records Committee, committee of the New York State Ornithological Association
It may also refer to:

 The Arc New York, an organization in New York State serving people with developmental disabilities